Andreas Suborics (born 11 August 1971) is an Austrian  Thoroughbred horse racing jockey who is based in Germany and races worldwide.

A three-time champion jockey in Germany, Suborics is best known as the jockey who rode Shirocco in 2004. In 2013/14, he ended the season with 14 wins for an HK career total of 55.

References 
 Andreas Suborics' official website (German language)

Austrian jockeys
German jockeys
Austrian expatriate sportspeople in Germany
Sportspeople from Vienna
1971 births
Living people
German racehorse trainers